The 1964 Chicago Cubs season was the 93rd season of the Chicago Cubs franchise, the 89th in the National League and the 49th at Wrigley Field. The Cubs finished eighth in the National League with a record of 76–86, 17 games behind the NL and World Series champion St. Louis Cardinals.

Offseason 
On February 13, Ken Hubbs, who had been the Cubs starting second baseman in 1963, was killed in a plane crash. He was replaced by Joey Amalfitano, who was acquired from the San Francisco Giants a few weeks later.

Notable transactions 
 December 2, 1963: Byron Browne was drafted by the Cubs from the Pittsburgh Pirates in the 1963 first-year draft.
 March 29, 1964: Joey Amalfitano was purchased by the Cubs from the San Francisco Giants.
 Prior to 1964 season: Dick LeMay was traded by the Cubs to the St. Louis Cardinals for Lee Gregory.

Regular season 
On June 15, the Cubs made one of the most infamous deals in baseball history, remembered today simply as "Brock for Broglio". There were six players involved in all, but the most prominent players involved were pitcher Ernie Broglio, who came to the Cubs from the St. Louis Cardinals, and outfielder Lou Brock, who went to the Cardinals from the Cubs. While Broglio was a serviceable starter for the rest of 1964, he would post ERAs over 6 in each of the next two seasons, and was out of baseball altogether by the end of 1967. Brock went on to star for the Cardinals for the next fifteen years, and eventually be elected to the Hall of Fame. It is to this day often held up as an example of a lopsided trade outcome.

Season standings

Record vs. opponents

Notable transactions 
 May 28, 1964: Chuck Hartenstein was signed as an amateur free agent by the Cubs.
 June 3, 1964: The Cubs traded $40,000 to the Milwaukee Braves for Len Gabrielson. The Cubs completed the deal by sending Merritt Ranew to the Braves on June 8.
 June 6, 1964: Jim Qualls was signed as an amateur free agent by the Cubs.
 June 15, 1964: Lou Brock, Jack Spring, and Paul Toth were traded by the Cubs to the St. Louis Cardinals for Ernie Broglio, Doug Clemens and Bobby Shantz.
 June 19, 1964: Don Kessinger was signed as an amateur free agent by the Cubs.

Roster

Player stats

Batting

Starters by position 
Note: Pos = Position; G = Games played; AB = At bats; H = Hits; Avg. = Batting average; HR = Home runs; RBI = Runs batted in

Other batters 
Note: G = Games played; AB = At bats; H = Hits; Avg. = Batting average; HR = Home runs; RBI = Runs batted in

Pitching

Starting pitchers 
Note: G = Games pitched; IP = Innings pitched; W = Wins; L = Losses; ERA = Earned run average; SO = Strikeouts

Other pitchers 
Note: G = Games pitched; IP = Innings pitched; W = Wins; L = Losses; ERA = Earned run average; SO = Strikeouts

Relief pitchers 
Note: G = Games pitched; W = Wins; L = Losses; SV = Saves; ERA = Earned run average; SO = Strikeouts

Farm system 

LEAGUE CHAMPIONS: Treasure Valley

Notes

References 

1964 Chicago Cubs season at Baseball Reference

Chicago Cubs seasons
Chicago Cubs season
Chicago Cubs